Orkhan Farajov (born on 7 January 2001) is an Azerbaijani football midfielder who plays for Keşla in the Azerbaijan Premier League.

Club career
On 11 May 2019, Farajov made his debut in the Azerbaijan Premier League for Keşla match against Sabail.

References

External links
 

2001 births
Living people
Association football midfielders
Azerbaijani footballers
Azerbaijan Premier League players
Shamakhi FK players